Raymond W. Hood (January 1, 1936 – March 22, 2002) was an American politician.

Hood was born in Detroit, Michigan. He went to California State University, Fullerton and played on the football team. He worked with the Michigan State Department of Licensing and Regulations and was the director of the department. Hood served in the Michigan House of Representatives from 1965 to 1982 and was a Democrat. His brother Morris Hood Jr. and his nephew Morris Hood III also served in the Michigan Legislature. Hood died in Port Charlotte, Florida.

Notes

1936 births
2002 deaths
African-American state legislators in Michigan
Politicians from Detroit
Cal State Fullerton Titans football players
Players of American football from Michigan
Democratic Party members of the Michigan House of Representatives
20th-century American politicians
20th-century African-American politicians
21st-century African-American people